John J. "Jack" McDonough was a college football player and one time president of Georgia Power. He also coached Savannah High School.

Georgia Tech
A native of Savannah, McDonough was a star quarterback for William Alexander's Georgia Tech Yellow Jackets football teams, inducted into the school's athletics hall of fame in 1962. McDonough amassed a 26–7 record while at Tech.

He started as a true freshman when Marshall Guill was moved to end, and only missed four games in four years due to an injury in his sophomore season caused by Pitt's Orville Hewitt.

See also 

 List of Georgia Tech Yellow Jackets starting quarterbacks

References

American football quarterbacks
Georgia Tech Yellow Jackets football players
Players of American football from Savannah, Georgia